This is a list of tributaries of the Tigris by order of entrance.

The Tigris originates in Turkey, forms a part of the borders of Turkey-Syria and flows through Iraq. It joins the Euphrates forming Shatt al-Arab, which empties into the Persian Gulf.

Notes

References 

Tigris